Andrey Gennadyevich Kislykh (born 24 November 1976 in Kemerovo) is a Russian former hurdler who competed in the 1996 Summer Olympics and in the 2000 Summer Olympics.

Competition record

References

1976 births
Living people
Russian male hurdlers
Russian male sprinters
Russian male long jumpers
Olympic male hurdlers
Olympic athletes of Russia
Athletes (track and field) at the 1996 Summer Olympics
Athletes (track and field) at the 2000 Summer Olympics
Universiade gold medalists in athletics (track and field)
Universiade gold medalists for Russia
Medalists at the 1997 Summer Universiade
World Athletics Championships athletes for Russia
Russian Athletics Championships winners
Sportspeople from Kemerovo